Amrita Prakash is an Indian actress and model. She began her acting career when she was four years old, and has acted in both Bollywood and Malayalam films. She has since, been seen in a myriad of Bollywood Films, TVCs and television reality and fiction shows.

Early life and career
Amrita holds a master's degree in Commerce and Business Administration from The University of Mumbai.

Amrita started her career as a four year old, with advertising. Her first TVC was for a local footwear company in Kerala. After which, over the course of her childhood she did over 50 commercials for prominent brands including Rasna, Ruffles Lays, Glucon-D, Dabur, etc. She was the face of Lifebuoy Soaps packaging for over two years. More recently she has been seen in commercials for Sunsilk, Gitts Processed Foods, etc.

Her stint with television started when she was 9 years old with a drama show in which she played Gautami Gadgil's niece. Right after which she bagged her own show when she was seen anchoring Fox Kids, a cartoon show on Star Plus for about 5 years, making her character of Miss India hugely popular, especially amongst the kids.

She gained popularity with her first film in 2001 - Anubhav Sinha's Tum Bin, where she played the pivotal part of Milli. Post Tum Bin, Amrita continued with television. When she was 14, she was chosen to be part of India's first Reality Show titled Kya Masti Kya Dhoom which she co-anchored alongside Bollywood Actress Sonali Bendre for over two years.

Her last television drama, where she played one of the lead protagonists was Har Ghar Kuch Kehta Hai for Zee TV.

In 2004, she appeared in Malayalam film Manjupoloru Penkutty directed by Kamal. The story focused around a 16-year-old school girl in Kerala who was tormented by and rose against her sexually abusive stepfather. The film was dubbed and re-released in Kannada and Telugu. Amrita was nominated by the State for the National Awards as Best Actress.

She went on to do one of her most defining roles with Rajshri Films, playing the character of Chhoti in Sooraj Barjatya's Vivah. Her performance in Vivaah was hugely appreciated by critics. Amrita has repeatedly been quoted saying- "Vivaah was one amongst the biggest milestones and turning points of my career. I cannot be grateful enough to him (Sooraj Barjatya) for being the teacher and guide he has been to me through and since the film. And for bringing me onto the map of every city in India."

Amrita played the character of Sandhya in Ek Vivah Aisa Bhi. She played a small part in Dharma Productions We Are Family.

She took up the show Ek Rishta Aisa Bhi for Sony Pal. She played the lead protagonist, Dipika on the show.

Filmography

Films

Television

References

External links 
 
 Amrita Prakash's Interview in Times of India
 Amrita Prakash's Interview in Times of India
 Official Website
 

Indian film actresses
Actresses in Malayalam cinema
Living people
Actresses from Jaipur
21st-century Indian actresses
Actresses in Hindi television
Child actresses in Malayalam cinema
1987 births